Emil H. Praeger (August 2, 1892 – October 16, 1973) was an American architect and civil engineer.

Biography
He was born in 1892.

Praeger graduated from Rensselaer Polytechnic Institute in 1915. He served in the U.S. Navy during World War I, after which he spent time at the architectural office of Bertram Goodhue and the New York City engineering firm Madigan-Hyland.

In 1934, as chief engineer for the City of New York Department of Parks & Recreation, Praeger surveyed all New York City parks. Under director Robert Moses, Praeger created architectural drawings, descriptions, and photographs for every park that the city owned. He also acted as head of the civil engineering department at RPI from 1939 to 1946.

During World War II, Praeger served in the US Navy, and he eventually reached the rank of captain. He developed the original design of the concrete floating breakwater - known as "Phoenix" - for the Invasion of Normandy.

Praeger served as consulting engineer on the White House renovations in 1949.

He died on  October 16, 1973.

Selected work
Henry Hudson Bridge, (chief engineer) New York, 1932
Marine Parkway-Gil Hodges Memorial Bridge, (chief engineer) New York, 1937
Pier 57, New York City, 1952
Arecibo Telescope at the Arecibo Observatory, Puerto Rico, 1952.
Holman Stadium, (chief engineer) Vero Beach, Florida, 1953
Tappan Zee Bridge, New York, 1955
Throg's Neck Bridge, (consulting engineer) New York, 1961
Shea Stadium, Flushing, New York, 1964
Dodger Stadium, Los Angeles, California, 1962

References 

1892 births
1973 deaths
20th-century American architects
Modernist architects
Rensselaer Polytechnic Institute alumni
Rensselaer Polytechnic Institute faculty